Onokivtsi is a village in Uzhhorod Raion (district) of Zakarpattia Oblast (province) in western Ukraine. The village's population is 2,187.

The village belonged in the 14th-17th centuries to the noble Drugeth family from the Kingdom of Hungary. The population there was mixed, there lived Slovaks and Rusins. In 1946 Slovaks moved to Czechoslovakia according to an agreement with the Soviet Union.

Famous people
 Annamari Dancha - Ukrainian snowboarder, 2019 World silver medalist, three-time Olympic participant

External links
 

Villages in Uzhhorod Raion
Populated places established in the 14th century